Johan Beetz (August 19, 1874 – March 26, 1949) was a Canadian naturalist of Belgian origin.  He settled in a small coastal town in the Côte-Nord region of Quebec, which was later renamed Baie-Johan-Beetz in his honour, along with the nearby bay, known as the baie Johan-Beetz.

He was born in Boortmeerbeek, Belgium, in the château d'Oudenhouven, to an aristocratic family.  His father Johannes Beetz died when he was two years old and his mother Céline Verzyl (or Versyl) remarried an English major named Walter Turner.  He had a privileged childhood and the future King Albert was among his childhood acquaintances.  In his youth, he participated in hunting in Morocco, Algeria and Congo, and took part in archeological digs.  He studied medicine and biology.

However, his fiancée (and cousin) Marthe Versyl died of pneumonia.  Apparently seeking a change in his life, he considered moving from Belgium to Africa, but then he happened to converse with a certain Monsieur Warner, who talked about the hunting and fishing in Pashti-Baie (or Piastrebaie) along the north shore of the Gulf of Saint Lawrence in Quebec, Canada, where Warner had a house.  Beetz bought Warner's house on the spot and moved there in May 1897. Within this year, Beetz meet Henry de Puyjalon, a pioneer in Canadian ecology who was among the first to suggest wildlife conservation areas.

Beetz married a local girl named Adéla Tanguay on September 27, 1898, and constructed a very large house, today known as the Maison Johan-Beetz and classified as a historic monument by the Quebec government. 
The imposing 12-room wooden house was built on a rocky prominence looking over the Piashti River.
They eventually had 11 children.  Beetz hunted, fished, and trapped with the local villagers, and raised foxes for their fur.  He was a naturalist and ornithologist, and made numerous studies and hand drawings.  He also invented a mummification process for preserving animal bodies; however, the technique was lost when he died.

From 1903 to 1913 he was the local postmaster, and he often served as a sort of doctor.  He was credited with sparing the village from the Spanish influenza in 1918–1919 by restricting external contact and disinfecting mail.

In 1922 the Beetz family moved to Saint-Laurent, then a suburb of Montreal and today a borough of the city.  He bought a house there at 54 rue Saint-Germain.  In July 1924, he was made a chevalier in the Order of Leopold II by the Belgian government. He later lived at 322 avenue Laurier, in Quebec City, which has a plaque mentioning that fact. In 1931 he founded a zoo in Charlesbourg (today part of Quebec City), later known by the name Jardin zoologique de Québec (it closed in 2006).

He continued to raise foxes at a farm in Vaudreuil.  When the business was badly affected by the 1929 stock market crash, he was named director of the fox furring department at the Service de l'élevage des animaux à fourrure of the Quebec government.  He wrote a book on the subject entitled "L'Indispensable" à l'éleveur de renards argentés; it was published in English translation as "The Indispensable" for Fox Breeders, translated by Thos. J. Carbray.  The Université de Montréal wished to give him an honorary doctorate; however, he preferred to deliver an oral thesis presentation, for which he was granted a Doctor of Science degree (Docteur ès Science agricole (vulpiculture)).  The fox breeding industry in Quebec did not survive long after the death of its founder, however.

In 1965, the village where he spent many years of his life was renamed Baie-Johan-Beetz. There are streets named after him in both Baie-Johan-Beetz and Sept-Îles.  There is also a lake, Lac Beetz, in the Lac-Jérôme unorganized territory, which may be named for him, although the Commission de toponymie du Québec does not attest this.

Johan Beetz was the grandfather of Jean Beetz, a justice of the Supreme Court of Canada.

References

External links
 
 
 Johan Beetz: Naturaliste
 
 
 

People from Montreal
Canadian naturalists
Knights of the Order of Leopold II
1874 births
1949 deaths
Belgian emigrants to Canada
People from Côte-Nord